David John Mlicki (born June 8, 1968) is a former right-handed pitcher in Major League Baseball (MLB). Between 1992 and 2002, he played for the Cleveland Indians, New York Mets, Los Angeles Dodgers, Detroit Tigers, and Houston Astros.

Career
After attending Oklahoma State University he was selected by the Cleveland Indians in the 17th round of the 1990 amateur draft. Mlicki was primarily a starting pitcher in the major leagues, but did earn one major league save. On June 21, 1996, he pitched 3 shutout innings to nail down a 9–4 victory over the Reds, saving the win for middle reliever Jerry Dipoto.

On June 16, 1997, he led the New York Mets to a 6–0 win over the New York Yankees at Yankee Stadium in the first ever non-exhibition game played between the two teams, pitching a complete game shutout. On October 10, 2001, he made his only postseason appearance, being credited with the loss in Game 2 of the National League Division Series despite not giving up an earned run in the five innings he pitched. Mlicki failed to make the Milwaukee Brewers roster during spring training in 2003, and retired shortly afterward.

References

External links

1968 births
Living people
Major League Baseball pitchers
New York Mets players
Los Angeles Dodgers players
Cleveland Indians players
Detroit Tigers players
Houston Astros players
Baseball players from Cleveland
Watertown Indians players
Columbus Indians players
Burlington Indians players (1986–2006)
Canton-Akron Indians players
Charlotte Knights players
West Michigan Whitecaps players
Toledo Mud Hens players
Round Rock Express players
New Orleans Zephyrs players
Oklahoma State Cowboys baseball players
American people of Polish descent